Yacine Sheikh (born 27 April 1966) is an Algerian boxer. He competed at the 1988 Summer Olympics and the 1992 Summer Olympics. At the 1988 Summer Olympics, he lost to Henry Martínez of El Salvador.

References

External links
 

1966 births
Living people
Algerian male boxers
Olympic boxers of Algeria
Boxers at the 1988 Summer Olympics
Boxers at the 1992 Summer Olympics
Place of birth missing (living people)
Flyweight boxers
21st-century Algerian people